Durab-e Sofla-ye Jadid (also Romanized as Dūrāb-e Soflá-ye Jadīd; also known as Dūrāb-e Soflá) is a village in Bahmai-ye Garmsiri-ye Shomali Rural District, Bahmai-ye Garmsiri District, Bahmai County, Kohgiluyeh and Boyer-Ahmad Province, Iran. At the 2006 census, its population was 101, in 20 families.

References 

Populated places in Bahmai County